Piro is a nagar parishad town and corresponding community development block in Bhojpur District, in the Indian state of Bihar.

Geography
It has an average elevation of 72 metres (236 feet).

Demographics

 India census, Piro had a population of 25,638. Males constitute 53% of the population and females 47%. Piro has an average literacy rate of 56%, lower than the national average of 59.5%: male literacy is 65%, and female literacy is 45%. 

In Piro, 18% of the population is under 6 years of age.

 the population of the town of Piro was 45,000 in 7,033 households.

Administration
The Piro sub-division (Tehsil) is headed by an IAS or state Civil service officer of the rank of Sub Divisional Magistrate (SDM).

Blocks
The Piro Tehsil is divided into 3 Blocks, each headed by a Block Development Officer (BDO). List of Blocks is as follows:
 Piro
 Charpokhari
 Tarari
Piro Balua Tola is one of the most developed village in Piro block.

List of villages 
Piro block contains the following 109 villages:

References

Cities and towns in Bhojpur district, India